Bear is a surname which may refer to: 
 Elizabeth Bear, pen name of American author Sarah Bear Elizabeth Wishnevsky (born 1971)
 Glecia Bear (born 1912), Canadian Cree writer
 Greg Bear (1951-2022), American author
 Jack Bear (1920–2007), American costume designer 
 Joseph Ainslie Bear (1878–1955), American banker
 Laura Bear (born 1965), British anthropologist and academic
 Liza Béar, American filmmaker
 Michael Bear (1934–2000), English cricketer

See also
 Barbara Bears (born 1971), American ballet dancer
 Bear (nickname)
 Bear (disambiguation)
Ber (name)
 List of fictional bears, including some where Bear is used as a surname

Surnames from nicknames